Nicholas Thieberger  is an Australian linguist and an Associate Professor in the School of Languages and Linguistics at the University of Melbourne. He helped to establish the PARADISEC archive in 2003 and currently serves as its Director. Thieberger was the Editor of Language Documentation & Conservation (2011-2021), an academic journal which focuses on language documentation and conservation. He was elected a Fellow of the Australian Academy of the Humanities in 2021.

Thieberger received his PhD from The University of Melbourne in 2004 for his work on the grammar of South Efate (Nafsan), which was the first grammar to demonstrate the use of a media corpus as the basis for examples used in the grammar. He is best known for his research on Indigenous Australian languages, on the South Efate (Nafsan) language of Vanuatu, and for his work in language documentation. He established Wangka Maya the Pilbara Aboriginal Language Centre in the late 1980s, ASEDA, the Aboriginal Studies Electronic Data Archive, in the early 1990s, and co-founded the Resource Network for Linguistic Diversity. He established Kaipuleohone, the University of Hawai'i's digital language archive.

Key publications 
[Many of these references are available here] 
 Barwick, Linda & Nicholas Thieberger. (eds.) 2006. Sustainable Data from Digital Fieldwork Sydney: Sydney University Press.
 McConvell, Patrick & Nicholas Thieberger. 2001. State of Indigenous languages in Australia - 2001. Australia State of the Environment Second Technical Paper Series (Natural and Cultural Heritage), Department of the Environment and Heritage, Canberra.
 Sharp, Janet & Nicholas Thieberger. 1992. Bilybara: Aboriginal languages of the Pilbara Region Port Hedland: Wangka Maya.
 Thieberger, Nicholas. 1993. Handbook of WA Aboriginal Languages south of the Kimberley Region Canberra: Pacific Linguistics.
 Thieberger, Nicholas. 2006. A Grammar of South Efate: An Oceanic Language of Vanuatu Oceanic Linguistics Special Publication, No. 33. Honolulu: University of Hawai'i Press.
 Thieberger, Nicholas (ed). 2012. The Oxford Handbook of Linguistic Fieldwork. Oxford: OUP.
 Thieberger, Nicholas & Bill McGregor (eds.).1994. Macquarie Aboriginal words: a dictionary of words of Australian Aboriginal and Torres Strait Islander languages Sydney: Macquarie Library.

References

External links 
Nick Thieberger's home page
The University of Melbourne "Find an Expert" page

Living people
Linguists from Australia
Linguists of Australian Aboriginal languages
Linguists of Austronesian languages
Linguists of Oceanic languages
La Trobe University alumni
University of Melbourne alumni
Year of birth missing (living people)
Fellows of the Australian Academy of the Humanities
Academic staff of the University of Melbourne